Kobo (Amharic  ቆቦ ) is a town in northern Ethiopia. It is the administrative center of Kobo woreda.

History 
Kobo is part of a mid-altitude area which lies between the Ethiopian Highlands to the west and the Afar Depression to the east. In medieval Ethiopia, much of Kobo was part of Angot, a province predominantly inhabited by the Qeda people, who spoke a language similar to Amharic. This area has been involved in disputes between the Christian highlanders and Muslims from the east since the time of the Ifat Sultanate (13th century). Much of the early conflict took place further south on the eastern border of what is now Shewa.  However, in the 16th century, the Angot now Raya area was the site of an important conflict in Ethiopian history between the armies of the General of Adal, Ahmad ibn Ibrahim al-Ghazi, known better amongst Ethiopians as Imam Ahmed Gragn, and the Abyssinian forces of Lebna Dengel. This infamous period of conflict was known as the Ethiopian-Adal War. The Ethiopians asked for help from the Portuguese, who arrived at port of Massawa on February 10, 1541. In April 1542 the two armies met north of Lake Hashenge (near Korem ). This marked the first use of firearms by the Abyssinian military. 
   
The battle was inconclusive. Ahmed and his forces spent the rainy season at Zobil Mountain (east of Kobo) while the Ethiopian forces stayed at near Lake Ashenge. Ahmed sent for armed assistance from the Ottoman Empire in Arabia.  According to Abbé João Bermudes, Imam Ahmad received 2000 musketeers from Arabia, and artillery and 900 picked men from the Ottomans. When Ahmed attacked the position near Lake Ashenge after the rainy season, he was successful and the Abyssinian Army moved back further west.  Eventually the Christians were victorious and Adal collapsed.
 
Most of the army of Ahmed was Somali, Afar, and Harari but some local Muslims from the Eastern fringe of the highlands participated.  The mid-altitude eastern fringe acquired a reputation of rebelliousness with respect to highland rule.

From 1928 until 1930 there was a large revolt over taxes and central government control in the Raya area. The military and areal bombardment was used to regain central control. This marked the first use of air power in Ethiopia. Some of the local rebels were involved with attacking Ethiopian forces when the Italians invaded in 1936. In January 1942 a clash at Kobo between locals and soldiers collecting taxes led to three British officers and nine Ethiopian soldiers killed. The Ethiopian government responded with an aerial bombardment of the town. This skirmish was one of the events which lead up to the Woyane rebellion. There was another Raya revolt in 1947–48. Repression of this revolt also involved areal bombardment.

Dejazmach Gobana Amedie had been given a land grant of 500 hectares near Waja (12° 17’ N 39° 36’ E) for his service in fighting the Italians between 1936 and 1941. He received this land after World War II.  Nobility of this sort served to pacify the area for the central Ethiopian government. However he took additional land from his farmer neighbors. He was taken to court by the neighbors. They won the case but the administration refused to enforce the ruling. At harvest time in 1971 when Gobena went to the fields to take the grain from the area that he claimed, he was attacked and killed by a large group of local men. The response of the Ministry of Interior was to send the Army to Kobo to make it clear that the central government was in control. This can be seen as part of the tradition of the Government of Ethiopia to extend central control which took place throughout the 19th and 20th centuries under both the traditional governments and their successors.   
      
In mid-1972, a young District Development Officer, Abebaw Kasai, sent a full report concerning conditions in the district to the Ministry of Community Development; this was the first warning of what became the brutal 1973–74 famine which set off the Ethiopian Revolution and led to the fall of Emperor Haile Selassie. The report was received with interest by the Ministry of Community Development, but was rejected by the Ministry of the Interior. Abebaw was severely reprimanded and told never to send such a negative report again. The Ministry of Agriculture commissioned a survey of the crop situation at harvest time in 1972. The survey was conducted by Paul Christensen, a United States Peace Corp volunteer. The survey accurately predicted that if the 1973 crops failed, about 220,000 people would be without food. The crops did fail in 1973.

The failure of the Ministry of the Interior to respond to the famine may be seen as a form of punishment for the local tendency to rebel, as well as a fatalism on the part of the central government when faced with acts of God.

Oxfam also declined to get involved in preparations for the famine prior to the appearance of beggars in the streets during the rainy season of 1973. After the effects of the famine became visible, Oxfam ran a famous television piece on the famine in Britain. The Catholic Relief Services provided effective relief in 1973–74. The Ministry of Rural Development and the Ministry of Agriculture provide food-for-work assistance through program which built the road from the plains to Zobil Mountain. The program distributed grain from the United States Agency for International Development.

During the abbreviated rainy season of 1973, with the displacement caused by the famine, cholera broke out in lowland Wollo. The Catholic Relief Service had organized health care in Kobo for those displaced by the famine and weakened by malnutrition. The rehydration provided at the Kobo station saved many lives among the cholera victims. 
   
In May 1983 the Catholic Relief Services made grant distributions from the Agency for International Development at Kobo in response to the later famine, By the next year, with the famine clearly underway, several thousand Afar people had come to the Catholic mission in Kobo in search of help; they had fled the lowlands after losing all their livestock. Between 15 October and 2 November 1989 Kobo was subjected to four air attacks by the government forces. Casualties are not known, but the clinic was strafed by helicopter gunships.

In March 2007, the Amhara Regional Rehabilitation and Development Agency announced the creation of a state-owned cotton processing factory, and a cotton plantation on 305 hectares to supply it, with a capitalization of 63 million Birr. The next month the Ethiopian Catholic Church announced the completion of a modern hospital with 50 beds.

In September 2021, residents reported the Tigray Defence Forces killed 600 civilians in and near Kobo, starting on 9 September as a battle between the TDF and local militia but turned against civilians soon thereafter as TDF soldiers went door-to-door killing in retaliation.

Demographics 
Based on a national census conducted by the Central Statistical Agency in 2007, this town had a total population of 24,867, of whom 12,385 were male and 12,482 female.

The 1994 census reported this town had a total population of 20,788 of whom 9,761 were male and 11,027 female. The two largest ethnic groups reported in Kobo were the Amhara (94.54%), and the Tigrayan (4.94%); all other ethnic groups made up 0.52% of the population. Amharic was spoken as a first language by 95.55%, and Tigrinya was spoken by 4.03%; the remaining 0.42% spoke all other primary languages reported. The majority of the population practiced Ethiopian Orthodox Christianity with 87.15% reporting to profess this belief, while 12.34% of the population said they were Muslim.

Notes 

Populated places in the Amhara Region
Ethiopia
Cities and towns in Ethiopia